Kūmāré is a 2011 documentary film directed by and starring American filmmaker Vikram Gandhi, who poses as an Indian guru to satirize the New Age movement.

Production
Gandhi came up with the idea of a fictional guru while recording another documentary film about yogis and their followers.

Gandhi transformed himself into "Sri Kumaré", an enlightened guru from a fictional village in India. He adopted a false Indian accent and grew out his hair and beard. In the documentary, Kumaré travels to Arizona to spread his made-up philosophy and gain sincere followers.

Reception
Kumaré premiered at the 2011 South by Southwest Film Festival (SXSW), where it received the festival's Feature Film Audience Award for Best Documentary Feature.

Kumaré received fair reviews upon release.  Many movie reviewers criticized Gandhi's deception as immoral, but had partial forgiveness for Gandhi for realizing that the experiment had grown out of his control. Many compared the project to Sacha Baron Cohen's Borat comedic documentary in which Cohen also posed as the title character. Roger Ebert of the Chicago Sun-Times praised the film, with Ebert reporting that its message is "It doesn't matter if a religion's teachings are true.  What matters is if you think they are."

References

External links
 
 
 

2011 films
American documentary films
2011 documentary films
Documentary films about religion
Films critical of religion
Fictional religious workers
2010s English-language films
2010s American films